Catherine Kousmine (September 17, 1904, in Hvalynsky, Russia – August 24, 1992, in Lutry, Switzerland) was a Russian physician who proposed an alternative cancer treatment.

Kousmine devised a restrictive diet for treating many human ailments including multiple sclerosis and cancer. There is, however, no scientific evidence that it is effective.

Life
Born in 1904 into a well-to-do family in Russia, Catherine Kousmine and her parents fled the country in 1916 before the Russian revolution, settling in Lausanne. The young Catherine went to the Ecole Supérieure of Lausanne where she graduated in sciences. She then went on to medical school. Upon graduation in 1928, she moved to Zurich, in professor Guido Fanconi's unit, to specialize in pediatrics, then worked in Vienna, Austria, where she got her degree in this discipline.

Back in Switzerland, she had to resume her work as a general practitioner because her degree in pediatrics was not recognized by Swiss authorities. Dr. Kousmine spent most of her life in Switzerland. She set up the Fondation Catherine Kousmine in Lutry, Switzerland, to promote her methods. It has sister foundations in France, Germany and Italy. There is also a Kousmine Medical Center in Vevey, Switzerland.

Work
Kousmine advocated a restrictive diet as a basis for treating a number of human ailments, especially cancer. The diet, that Dr. Kousmine provided as an alternative to mainstream medicine  emphasizes first of all to put off saturated fats, totally for very ill people,  to eat fruits, vegetables and a lot of whole grains and particularly advocates a no cooked grain- and no cooked seed-based breakfast; vitamins supplements are also incorporated.

Awards

In 1985, the Société d'Encouragement au Progrès — whose headquarters are in Paris (France) — gave her the Médaille de Vermeil for her outstanding accomplishment with multiple sclerosis.
In 1989, she was made an honorary citizen of Lutry, Switzerland.

Publications
Soyez bien dans votre assiette jusqu'à 80 ans et plus (Be mindful of your diet, up to 80 and beyond), éditions Sand, 1980, 
La sclérose en plaque est guérissable (Multiple sclerosis is curable), éditions Delachaux et Nestlé 1983, 
Sauvez votre corps (Save your body), éditions Robert Laffont, 1987, is a sequel to Soyez bien dans votre assiette, with more cases and in-depth explanations

See also
Alternative cancer treatments
Diet and cancer
Johanna Budwig

References

Swiss general practitioners
Women nutritionists
1904 births
1992 deaths
Swiss women scientists
Swiss nutritionists
Alternative cancer treatment advocates
Biologically-based therapies
Orthomolecular medicine advocates
Pseudoscientific diet advocates
Russian pediatricians
20th-century Swiss scientists
20th-century women scientists
Emigrants from the Russian Empire to Switzerland